is a radio segment in Aiko's radio program Aiko's @llnightnippon.com, which aired from 1999 until 2003. When musical guests were invited to the program, Aiko would play the piano and cover the guests'—or others'—songs; sometimes, she sang her own songs with her guests. Rarely, Aiko would improvise a short song with a guest.

Performed songs 
Unless indicated, all songs are covered by Aiko.

1999 
 Ami Suzuki (1999), "Our Days".
 SMAP (1999), "Fly".
 T.M.Revolution (1998), "Thunderbird".
 Porno Graffitti (1999), .
 B'z (1992),  in Friends.
 Original words by Josef Mohr, music by Franz Gruber (1818), "Silent Night", first performed in Austria. Sung the English version.
 Taiyō to Ciscomoon (1999), .
 "Santa Claus Is Coming to Town". Sung with Yuzu and Taiyō to Ciscomoon.

2000 
 Yuzu (1999), .
 Hana*hana (1999), . Sung with Hana*hana.
 Mr.Children (1996), .
 Masaharu Fukuyama (1999), "Squall".
 Yen Town Band (1996), "Swallowtail Butterfly".
 Spitz (1996), .
 L'Arc-en-Ciel (1999), "Pieces".
 Yumi Matsutoya (1994), .
 Masayoshi Yamazaki (1997), "One More Time, One More Chance.
 Kinki Kids (2000), . Sung with Tsuyoshi Domoto.
 Kiroro (1999), . Sung with Kiroro.
 Iruka (1990), . Sung with Kiroro.
 Aiko's "Kabutomushi" (1999). Sung with Yuzu.
 Stevie Wonder (1996), "Isn't She Lovely?". Sung with Isa.
 SMAP (1998), . Sung with Yuka Kawamura.
 Akiko Kosaka (1988), .
 Aiko & Spitz (2000). An impromptu song.
 Luna Sea (1998), "I for You". Sung with Luna Sea.
 The Love (1997), . Sung with The Love.
 Aiko & Silva (2000), . An impromptu song.
 Nana Kinomi and Hiroshi Itsuki (1991), . Sung with Masaharu Fukuyama.
 SMAP (2000), .

2001 
 Aiko & Porno Graffiti (2001), . An impromptu song.
 Aiko & Tsuyoshi Domoto (2001), . An impromptu song.
 Yūzō Kayama (1988), . Sung with Fureai.
 Aiko & Gackt (2001), . An impromptu song.
 Carole King (1999), "So Far Away" in Tapestry. Sung with The Gospellers.
 Kirinji (2001), . Sung with Kirinji.
 Aiko & Chemistry (2001),  with Chemistry.  An impromptu song.
 Southern All Stars (1988), . Sung with Yuzu.
 Aiko (2001), . Parody of Strawberry Flower (2001), .
 Sadistic Mika Band (1974), .

2002 
 Miyuki Nakajima (1988), . Sung with Kobukuro.
 Aiko & The Brilliant Green (2002), . An impromptu song.
 Kome Kome Club (1992), . Sung with Reo Tsuchiya.
 Every Little Thing (2001), "Fragile". Sung with Kaori Mochida.

2003 
 Shikao Suga (2001),  in Sugarless. Sung with Shikao Suga.

External links 
 ゲスト／歌え！aiko – ヌルコムアーカイブス
 aikoのジングル大作戦 – the words of impromptu songs by aiko and her guests

J-pop